An electrically-assisted turbocharger (EAT) is an arrangement where an electric motor assists the gas-driven turbocharger in providing forced induction, particular at times when exhaust gas flow is insufficient to produce the desired boost. Some systems integrate the motor inside a turbocharger, while others use a separate electric supercharger.

Systems

BorgWarner 
BorgWarner tested the idea in the 1990s, but never produced a part for production vehicles because of high power consumption, until the Mercedes-Benz M256 engine (2017), which used a 48-volt electrical system.

, BorgWarner markets two EAT solutions: a standalone "electric compressor" (i.e. supercharger) named eBooster and a turbocharger with a single-shaft motor attached named eTurbo.

Garrett Motion 
In October 2019, Garrett Motion announced its first electric turbocharger for market passenger vehicles, with expected launch in 2021. The design adds an electric motor between the turbocharger's turbine wheel and compressor wheel.

The 2023 Mercedes-AMG SL 43 convertible uses the Mercedes-Benz M139 engine, which features the integrated Garrett Motio EAT.

Volkswagen TDI 
The TDI line used by the Audi brand has seen 4.0 V8 TDI 310-320kW, used on the Audi SQ7 and more. It has 2 turbochargers and 1 electric supercharger.

Volvo 
In 2010, Volvo started to experiment with electrically-assisted turbochargers. The result was unveiled in 2014, a 450hp 2.0L High Performance Drive-E Powertrain Concept engine, which used a 48-volt electrical system for the electric booster. The engine has three turbos, with the electric "turbo" driving the exhaust turbines of the twin-turbo. Despite initial reports that the Volvo XC90 T6 would have an related improvement, only the 2016 Volvo XC90 T8 actually received a Twin Engine starter-generator-supercharger in addition to the mechanical twincharger arrangement.

In 2019, Volvo reiterated plans to replace the mechanical supercharger with an electric one.

Abandoned 
In the late 1990s, Turbodyne also investigated EAT designs.

Related devices 
An electric supercharger also uses an electric motor to power the compressor, however the electric motor is the sole power source in an electric supercharger.

A turbocharger that can divert some of the exhaust gas to produce electricity (using the vehicle's alternator) is sometimes called a hybrid turbocharger.

References

 
Engine technology
Turbochargers

de:Motoraufladung
es:Sobrealimentador
id:Supercharger
it:Compressore volumetrico